Margita "Magi" Stefanović (1 April 1959 – 18 September 2002) was a Serbian musician best known as a keyboardist of a Yugoslav rock band Ekatarina Velika (EKV).

Biography
Born in Belgrade, she was the only child of well-known theatre and television director Slavoljub Stefanović-Ravassi and Desanka Nikolić. After finishing elementary school, Margita enrolled in the "Josip Slavenski" music high school from which she graduated as the most talented pianist in her class alongside Ivo Pogorelić. Her impressive school performance led to an offer of further studies at the famed Moscow Conservatory, which she ended up turning down due to family reasons—her mother very much disliked the idea of letting her go to Moscow by herself at such a young age. Instead, Margita enrolled at the University of Belgrade's School of Architecture where she was no less successful. Throughout her architecture studies she still continued practicing the piano as well as playing and occasionally touring with various small orchestras.

After graduating university in 1982, along with her then-boyfriend Srđan Vejvoda, she began to take an interest in Belgrade's underground music scene, which struck her as a completely different lifestyle from the one she was used to. During the spring of 1982 she was introduced to Milan Mladenović by her cousin Gagi Mihajlović. Soon thereafter, at one of Katarina II's early rehearsals, she got an offer to join the band. After returning from a three-month trip to South America she decided to take the still-standing offer, joining Katarina II in late 1982.

Margita was Katarina II/Ekatarina Velika's member until its very end in late 1994. During her time with the band she also collaborated on the albums of many other Yugoslav bands such as Karlowy Vary produced by Tomo in der Mühlen, Elvis J. Kurtović & His Meteors, Van Gogh, Babe, etc.

She composed the score for several TV films ("Prvi put s ocem na jutrenje", "Vera Hofmanova", "Povratak Vuka Alimpića", "Plavi plavi") and theatre productions ("Klasni neprijatelj", "Tri sestre"). In 1985 she was introduced as an actress (the role of Dragana) in the movie "Tajvanska kanasta" (The Taiwan Canasta) directed by Goran Marković.

After Milan's death and Ekatarina Velika's end, Magi continued her work as a musician. During 1994/1995 she played in a band called Kurajberi, which gathered several Belgrade musicians and was focused mainly on performing covers at club gigs and jam sessions. In 1995, with a group of young Belgrade musicians involved in a techno movement, she formed a band called EQV and released an album Ti si sav moj bol (You are All of My Anguish) named after the famous Ekatarina Velika song, the album itself containing a techno version of the same song. The album was published by the Austrian label Coop Arts & Crafts Unlimited. In October of the same year, EQV participated in Tactic Festival in Vienna. She further continued contributing as a guest star on albums and concerts of many Serbian bands and occasionally played with bands Glisers, Zion banda and Direktori.
Magi played keyboards in Belgrade's band "The Glissers" 1995. and 1996. They performed on a weekly basis and released a CD "The Glissers Vol. 1" for IMAGO Records. She also designed the cover for it. In 2019. it came out in vinyl form as an Album The Glissers for Yugovinyl and BIVECO. 
In 1996 she played several unplugged concerts with Električni orgazam, one of which was recorded and released the same year by B92 as Živo i akustično (Live and Acoustic). During that time she was also involved in several significant music projects ("S one strane duge", "Pesme iznad Istoka i Zapada").

Sometime in 1996 Margita became a member of Ars Antibari writers society from Bar, which published several of her stories in two books ("Izgleda da će Jugo", Bar, 1996, and "Da li da ti kažem ko te je ubio, Gea?", Belgrade, 1999). In 2002 she composed the music for "Kaput mrtvog čoveka" (The Coat of a Dead Man) theater play directed by Hajdana Baletić, which turned out to be Magi's last music-related work.

However, from 1996 onwards her life was mostly spent struggling with heroin addiction and the physical effects of long-term drug use. Following the passing of her father in February 1996, Margita's drug problems intensified. In order to support her habit, she sold pretty much all of her possessions including an apartment in downtown Belgrade. She used part of the money for a trip to India and also to buy two smaller apartments. Not long thereafter she sold those as well and eventually ended up living in a ramshackle modified garage in the suburb of Borča. By this time she was basically penniless, depending on charity and handouts for even the basics such as food.

Margita Stefanović spent the last months of her life living in a homeless shelter in Voždovac. She was diagnosed to be HIV-positive, which she contracted through intravenous drug use. She died on 18 September 2002 (aged 43) at the Belgrade Hospital for Infective Diseases where she had been sequestered since August of the same year.

Other
Magi played keyboards in Belgrade's band "The Glissers" 1995. and 1996. They performed on a weekly basis and released a CD "The Glissers Vol. 1" She also designed the cover for it. In 2019. it came out in vinyl form as an Album The Glissers.
There is an urban legend about Margita being the subject of the first-ever graffiti that appeared in Belgrade. The graffiti was written on the wall of her apartment building, and it said "Margita je dečak" ("Margita is a boy"), implying that she was an atypical girl of the era. The graffiti was sprayed by Nebojša Krstić, at the time a member of the Serbian new wave band VIS Idoli.
In July 2008, a book Vrati unatrag by Aleksandar Ilić, featuring conversations with Magi was released.
In October 2011, a voluminous, richly illustrated intimate memoir titled "Osećanja. O. Sećanja" written by Magi's close lifelong friend Lidija Nikolić was released by the small publishing house "Cekic" in Belgrade. The book has already been reprinted once.

References

Sources
 "Magi, zvezda koja večno traje" (Beograd, 2002)
 Petar Janjatović: "Ilustrovana Yu-Rock enciklopedija" (Beograd, 1998)
 Aleksandar Žikić: "Mesto u mećavi" (Beograd, 1997)

1959 births
2002 deaths
Serbian rock keyboardists
Yugoslav musicians
Musicians from Belgrade
University of Belgrade Faculty of Architecture alumni
Post-punk musicians
AIDS-related deaths in Serbia
Women in punk
20th-century Serbian musicians
20th-century women musicians
21st-century Serbian musicians
21st-century women musicians